The Yellow Pages Association, known in the industry as the YPA, is the regulating body of the United States' yellow pages industry.

Founded in 1975 as the National Yellow Pages Service Association (NYPSA), the Yellow Pages Association (YPA) is the largest trade organization of a print and digital media industry valued at more than $31 billion worldwide. Association members include Yellow Pages publishers, who produce products that account for almost 90 percent of the Yellow Pages revenue generated in the U.S. and Canada. Members also include the industry's international, national and local sales forces, certified marketing representatives (CMRs) and associate members, a group of industry stakeholders that include Yellow Pages advertisers, vendors and suppliers. The association has members in 29 countries.

The European counterpart to the YPA is the European Association of Directory and Database Publishers (EADP).

Recently, YPA has changed the name into Local Search Association.

External links
YPA Website 
EADP Website
The Web Directory

Yellow pages
Trade associations based in the United States